Pakistan participated in the 8th Asian Games in Bangkok, Thailand in 1978. These games were originally scheduled to be held in its capital, Islamabad.

Medallists

References

Nations at the 1978 Asian Games
1978
Asian Games